Petar Spasov (born 13 March 1934) is a Bulgarian boxer. He competed at the 1952 Summer Olympics and the 1960 Summer Olympics.

References

1934 births
Living people
Bulgarian male boxers
Olympic boxers of Bulgaria
Boxers at the 1952 Summer Olympics
Boxers at the 1960 Summer Olympics
Sportspeople from Sofia
Light-heavyweight boxers